Neil Paterson may refer to:

Neil Paterson (figure skater) (born 1964), Canadian figure skater
Neil Paterson (writer) (1915–1995), Scottish writer of novels, short stories and screenplays
Neil Paterson (rugby union) (born 1975), rugby union player and referee
Neil Paterson (police officer), Assistant Commissioner of Victoria Police

See also
Neal Patterson (1949–2017), CEO of Cerner
Neil Patterson (disambiguation)